Touzalinia is a genus of beetles in the family Buprestidae, containing the following species:

 Touzalinia belladonna Holynski, 1981
 Touzalinia psilopteroides Thery, 1923

References

Buprestidae genera